Halogranum (common abbreviation Hgn.) is a genus of halophilic archaea in the family of Haloferacaceae.

References

Archaea genera
Taxa described in 2010
Euryarchaeota